Gmina Siedliszcze is a rural gmina (administrative district) in Chełm County, Lublin Voivodeship, in eastern Poland.

Villages
Gmina Siedliszcze contains the villages and settlements of Adolfin, Anusin, Bezek, Bezek Dębiński, Bezek-Kolonia, Borowo, Brzeziny, Chojeniec, Chojeniec-Kolonia, Dobromyśl, Gliny, Jankowice, Janowica, Julianów, Kamionka, Krowica, Kulik, Kulik-Kolonia, Lechówka, Lipówki, Majdan Zahorodyński, Marynin, Mogilnica, Nowe Chojno, Romanówka, Siedliszcze, Siedliszcze-Kolonia, Siedliszcze-Osada, Stare Chojno, Stasin Dolny, Wojciechów, Wola Korybutowa Druga, Wola Korybutowa Pierwsza, Wola Korybutowa-Kolonia and Zabitek.

Neighbouring gminas
Gmina Siedliszcze is bordered by the gminas of Chełm, Cyców, Milejów, Puchaczów, Rejowiec Fabryczny, Trawniki and Wierzbica.

References
Polish official population figures 2006

Siedliszcze
Chełm County